Aleksikovsky is a rural locality (a khutor) and the administrative center of Aleksikovskoye Rural Settlement, Novonikolayevsky District, Volgograd Oblast, Russia. The population was 1,537 as of 2010. There are 29 streets.

Geography 
Aleksikovsky is located in forest steppe, on the Khopyorsko-Buzulukskaya Plain, 6 km southwest of Novonikolayevsky (the district's administrative centre) by road. Novonikolayevsky is the nearest rural locality.

References 

Rural localities in Novonikolayevsky District